Fred Sanford may refer to:
 Fred Sanford (baseball) (1919–2011), Major League Baseball pitcher
 Fred Sanford (musician) (1947–2000), percussionist, teacher, composer, and clinician
 Fred G. Sanford, fictional character in the 1972 sitcom Sanford and Son

See also 
 Fred (name)